is a Japanese time attack driver. He is currently a judge at American Formula D events. Yamada has raced in both the JGTC and Japanese Touring Car Championship.

He gained popularity on several Japanese videos with BAKA-MON, his trademarked logo that translates loosely as "stupid monkey." Players of the Juiced 2: Hot Import Nights video game need to compete against a representation of Yamada to advance in the game. Before that, he was a regular feature on Video Option.

Yamada has raced in numerous series in Japan and America since 1981. His championships include the 1991 Formula Mirage class  and 2002 N1 Super Taikyu endurance.

Yamada, competing in the Cyber Evo, is a two-time World Time Attack Challenge champion (2010, 2011) in the event held annually in Sydney, Australia.

References

External links
Super GT 2005 Profile

1962 births
D1 Grand Prix
Drifting drivers
Japanese racing drivers
Japanese Touring Car Championship drivers
Living people